Friedrich Maria Heinrich Anton Franz-Joseph Hartig or Federico Hartig (29 August 1900, Bolzano – 24 June 1980, Merano) was an Italian entomologist who specialised in Lepidoptera.

Friedrich Hartig was a Reichsgraf. In 1963 he discovered the European owl moth.

Publications
Partial list (commenced):
Microlepidotteri della Venezia Tridentina e delle regioni adiacenti. Parte III. (Fam. Gelechiidae-Micropterygidae). Studi Trentini delle Scienze Naturali, Acta Biologia 41(3-4): 1-292.

External links
DEI biografi Collection details.
La Sapienza All Hartig's publications.

Italian lepidopterists
1900 births
1980 deaths
20th-century Italian zoologists